Profanum is the Latin word for "profane".  The state of being profane, or "profanity," refers to a lack of respect for things that are held to be sacred, which implies anything inspiring or deserving of reverence, as well as behaviour showing similar disrespect or causing religious offense.

The distinction between the sacred and the profane was considered by Émile Durkheim to be central to the social reality of human religion.

Etymology 
The term profane originates from classical Latin profanus, literally "before (outside) the temple", "pro" being outside and "fanum" being temple or sanctuary. It carried the meaning of either "desecrating what is holy" or "with a secular purpose" as early as the 1450s. Profanity represented secular indifference to religion or religious figures, while blasphemy was a more offensive attack on religion and religious figures, considered sinful, and a direct violation of The Ten Commandments. Moreover, many Bible verses speak against swearing. In some countries, profanity words often have Pagan roots that after Christian influence were turned from names of deities and spirits to profanity and used as such, like famous Finnish profanity word perkele, which was believed to be an original name of the thunder god Ukko, the chief god of the Finnish pagan pantheon.

Profanities, in the original meaning of blasphemous profanity, are part of the ancient tradition of the comic cults which laughed and scoffed at the deity or deities: an example of this would be Lucian's Dialogues of the Gods satire.

Sacred-profane dichotomy 

The sacred-profane dichotomy is a concept posited by the French sociologist Émile Durkheim, who considered it to be the central characteristic of religion: "religion is a unified system of beliefs and practices relative to sacred things, that is to say, things set apart and forbidden." In Durkheim's theory, the sacred represents the interests of the group, especially unity, which were embodied in sacred group symbols, or totems. The profane, however, involves mundane individual concerns. Durkheim explicitly stated that the sacred–profane dichotomy is not equivalent to good-evil, as the sacred could be either good or evil, and the profane could be either as well.

Durkheim's claim of the universality of this dichotomy for all religions and cults has been criticized by scholars such as the British anthropologist Jack Goody. Goody also noted that "many societies have no words that translate as sacred or profane and that ultimately, just like the distinction between natural and supernatural, it was very much a product of European religious thought rather than a universally applicable criterion." According to Tomoko Masuzawa any cosmology without a sacred–profane binary was rendered invisible by the field of religious studies, privileging Christianity at the expense of non-Christian systems because the binary was supposed to be "universal",

The profane world consists of all that people can know through their senses; it is the natural world of everyday life that people experience as either comprehensible or at least ultimately knowable — the Lebenswelt or lifeworld.

In contrast, the sacred, or sacrum in Latin, encompasses all that exists beyond the everyday, natural world that people experience with their senses. As such, the sacred or numinous can inspire feelings of awe, because it is regarded as ultimately unknowable and beyond limited human abilities to perceive and comprehend. Durkheim pointed out however that there are degrees of sacredness, so that an amulet for example may be sacred yet little respected.

Transitions

Rites of passage represent movements from one state—the profane—to the other, the sacred; or back again to the profanum.

Religion is organized primarily around the sacred elements of human life and provides a collective attempt to bridge the gap between the sacred and the profane.

Profane progress
Modernization and the Enlightenment project have led to a secularisation of culture over the past few centuries – an extension of the profanum at the (often explicit) expense of the sacred. The predominant 21st-century global worldview is as a result empirical, sensate, contractual, this-worldly – in short profane.

Carl Jung expressed the same thought more subjectively when he wrote that "I know – and here I am expressing what countless other people know – that the present time is the time of God's disappearance and death".

Counter reaction

The advance of the profane has led to several countermovements, attempting to limit the scope of the profanum. Modernism set out to bring myth and a sense of the sacred back into secular reality — Wallace Stevens speaking for much of the movement when he wrote that "if nothing was divine then all things were, the world itself".

Fundamentalism – Christian, Muslim, or other – set its face against the profanum with a return to sacred writ.

Psychology too has set out to protect the boundaries of the individual self from profane intrusion, establishing ritual places for inward work in opposition to the postmodern loss of privacy.

Cultural examples
Seamus Heaney considered that "the desacralizing of space is something that my generation experienced in all kinds of ways".

See also

References

Further reading

Ernest Gellner, Postmodernism, Reason and Religion (1992)
Mircea Eliade, Patterns in Comparative Religion (1993)
 Acquaviva, S. S., and Patricia Lipscomb. The Decline of the Sacred in Industrial Society..
 Bakhtin, Mikhail. [1941] 1993 Rabelais and His World, translated by H. Iswolsky. Bloomington: Indiana University Press.
 Barber, C. Renate. 1965. "Sacred and Profane: Some Thoughts on the Folk-Urban Continuum of This Dichotomy." Man 65:45–46.  
 Colpe, Carsten. "The Sacred and the Profane," translated by R. M. Stockman. In the Encyclopedia of Religion. via Encyclopedia.com.
 Durkheim, Emile. 1912. The Elementary Forms of the Religious Life, 
 [1915] 1965, translated by Joseph Swain. The Free Press: 
 1995, translated by Karen E. Fields. The Free Press: 
 Eliade, Mircea. 1957. The Sacred and the Profane: The Nature of Religion, translated by W. R. Trask. New York: Harcourt Brace & World.
 Pals, Daniel. 1996. Seven Theories of Religion. New York: Oxford University Press.  (pbk).

Sociology of religion
Dichotomies
Émile Durkheim
Sociological theories